DXWS (105.3 FM), broadcasting as Praise Radio 105.3, is a radio station owned and operated by MIT Radio TV Network. Its studios and transmitter are located in Malaybalay.

References

Radio stations established in 2008
Radio stations in Bukidnon
Christian radio stations in the Philippines